Yanajaja (possibly from Quechua yana black, qaqa, rock) is a mountain in the Vilcanota mountain range in the Andes of Peru, about  high. It is situated in the Cusco Region, Canchis Province, Pitumarca District and in the Quispicanchi Province, Ocongate District. Yanajaja lies south of the peak of Q'ampa, southwest of Callangate, west of the river Chillcamayu, and east of Ausangate, close to Chilinita (Santa Catalina).

See also 
 Huayruro Punco

References

Mountains of Peru
Mountains of Cusco Region